Clouds in My Coffee: 1965-1995 is a three-disc box set by American singer-songwriter Carly Simon, released by Arista Records, on November 7, 1995. 

A full career retrospective at the time of its release, it contains 58 songs spanning Simon's career from 1965 to 1995. Nine tracks were previously unreleased on any of Simon's albums. The booklet includes numerous photographs and extensive liner notes by Simon. The album's title is taken from a refrain in Simon's song "You're So Vain".

Reception

A contemporary review from People stated: "It’s no secret that Carly Simon plumbs the Sturm und Drang of her life for source material. This triple-CD boxed set, spanning 30 years of her work, is a virtual autobiography in song. It boasts 58 tracks, including Top 40 hits, previously unreleased studio cuts (like 1972’s lovely country-flavored "I’m All It Takes to Make You Happy"), and collectors' items (her spare version of "Take Me Out to the Ball Game"). For those doubting her range, Simon proves here that she is more than a lite-FM goddess. The biggest surprise is the way she can wrap her sultry voice around a classic like the Gershwins' "I've Got a Crush on You" or Rodgers and Hammerstein's "Something Wonderful". All in all, the package is some kinda wonderful."

A retrospective review from AllMusic stated: "Rather than focusing on hits and other material most beloved by fans, retrospectives compiled by the artists themselves tend to reflect personal favorites, overbalanced with more recent material. By organizing this three-disc set into three different, non-chronological collections, Carly Simon partially defeats those tendencies. The first disc, The Hits, performs the valuable function of bringing together most of her biggest singles, previously spread across many records on many labels. The second disc, Miscellaneous & Unreleased, seems aimed at the collector. And the third, Cry Yourself to Sleep, is the best-intentioned one of all -- though perceived as a singles artist, Simon has written some of her best and most personal music on isolated album tracks."

Track listing
Credits adapted from the album's liner notes.

Notes
 signifies a writer by additional lyrics

References

External links
 Carly Simon's Official Website

Albums produced by Frank Filipetti
1995 compilation albums
Carly Simon compilation albums
Arista Records compilation albums
Albums produced by Paul Samwell-Smith
Albums produced by Richard Perry
Albums recorded at MSR Studios
Albums recorded at Morgan Sound Studios
Albums recorded at A&M Studios
Albums recorded at Sunset Sound Recorders
Albums recorded at Trident Studios
Albums recorded at Electric Lady Studios
Albums arranged by Paul Buckmaster
Cloud in culture